Peter Wang is a Taiwanese actor and director from Beijing. He is best known for writing and directing the 1986 film, A Great Wall, the first American feature  to be co-produced by the People's Republic of China.

Wang was born in Beijing but grew up in Taiwan following the Chinese Communist Revolution in 1949. Wang emigrated to the United States in the 1970s to pursue a PhD  in electro-optics at the University of Pennsylvania but during a teaching stint at San Mateo College in the Bay Area, he began acting at San Francisco's Asian Living Theatre. Wang's first film role came as Henry, a singing Chinatown chef, in Wayne Wang's Chan Is Missing (1982). In 1983, Wang and producer Shirley Sun partnered with the Chinese production company, Nanhai, and this led to Wang writing, directing and starring in A Great Wall. For 1988's sci-fi film The Laser Man, Wang revisited his experiences in graduate school where he had studied laser weapon research.

Filmography
Chan Is Missing (1982)
A Great Wall (1986)
The Laser Man (1988)
First Date (1989)

References

External links

Possibly living people
20th-century American male actors
American film directors
Film directors from Beijing
Year of birth missing (living people)